The Lebbo' people (also known as the Basap) are part of the indigenous Dayak people of East Kalimantan and North Kalimantan, Indonesia.

Before the modern era, the Lebbo' people were often hunter-gatherers or horticulturalists.

Most members of the Lebbo' live in the Sangkulirang-Mangkalihat Karst range and speak a variety of the Basap language.

Population genetics
In their full autosomal genome, the Lebbo' harbor both Austronesian-related and Mainland Southeast Asian (=Austroasiatic-related) ancestries, like most ethnic groups in the western part of Insular Southeast Asia. Additionally (and – as of now – uniquely among peoples sampled from Borneo and other parts of western Insular Southeast Asia), they have a significant ancestral compontent related to Papuans.

In a small sample of  Lebbo' males (15 individuals) the following Y-DNA haplogroups were found: C* (M130) 13.33%, K* (M9) 6.67%, K2 (M526) 13.33%, O1b1a1a1a1a (M88) 33.33%, O1a2 (M50) 26.67%, and O2a1b~ (M164) 6.67%. A previous study found a small percentage of Lebbo' males (two individuals) to be the only known members of the rare  C1b1a2a, also known as C-B67. (The less rare sibling clade C1b1a2b/C-F725 has been found in members of the Murut people in Brunei, Malay people in Singapore, Aeta people in the Philippines, and Han Chinese in China.)

The most common Mitochondrial DNA haplogroups found amongst a small sample of 19 Lebbo' individuals were: B4a 21.05%, B5a 15.79%, M20 15.79%, M71a2 15.79%, R9b1a1a 10.53% and E1a 21.05% out of a sample size of 19 Lebbo' people.

Footnotes

Ethnic groups in Indonesia
East Kalimantan
Headhunting
Dayak people